Elmira College is a private college in Elmira, New York. Founded as a college for women in 1855, it is the oldest existing college granting degrees to women that were the equivalent of those given to men. Elmira College became coeducational in all of its programs in 1969. The college has an enrollment of under 850 students.

The school's colors, purple and gold, are seen throughout the traditional campus, consisting mainly of buildings of the Victorian and Collegiate Gothic architectural styles. The colors purple and gold come from both the banners of the women's suffrage movement and the iris, the college flower.

Offered are about thirty-five major areas of study, each ultimately leading to either a BS or BA degree upon a successful completion of undergraduate studies. Students attend two full terms in the fall and winter and then enroll in a 6-week, intensive "Term III" in the spring. This gives students an opportunity to study abroad, intern, or take classes not related to their majors, to enrich the educational experience.

Elmira College has an extensive Mark Twain (Samuel Clemens) archive and is home of the Center For Mark Twain Studies, dedicated to the promotion and support of Twain-related scholarship. The octagonal study in which Twain wrote many of his most widely read novels, including A Connecticut Yankee in King Arthur's Court and Adventures of Huckleberry Finn, is located on campus, and the Center maintains Quarry Farm, where the Clemens family spent more than twenty Summers, as a research facility for Twain scholars. Every four years the college hosts the International Conference On The State of Mark Twain Studies.

History

Origin
According to Thomas Woody, Elmira College is "the oldest existing women's college in the United States which succeeded in attaining standards in a fair degree comparable with men's colleges at the very beginning of her career".
Elmira College was first conceived by a group of men at a meeting on April 11, 1851, in Albany, New York. This group, which referred to itself as "Friends of Education", had the intention of creating a college that would grant degrees to women; these degrees would be equal to the degrees given to men at the time. The chairman of the meeting was Isaac N. Wyckoff, who had had previous experience in female education as a principal of a girls' school in New Brunswick. The group adopted a series of resolutions devoted to the equalization of women's education with that of men. The six members of this group chose to create a committee, of which they were all members, that would carry out their resolutions.

On April 12, the committee appointed the Harvey A. Sackett, Yale College 1838, as the "General Agent" for the committee (14). His first task was to find a location for the college. A possibility was the city of Carmel, New York, but it was rejected for a more desirable central New York location. This desire materialized when citizens of Auburn, New York declared their wish for the committee to establish the college in their town to replace a female seminary that had been destroyed in a fire. The committee accepted the proposal and began working to raise funds for the establishment of the college in Auburn. However, the committee was unable to raise the necessary money or garner substantial interest, and by July 1853 the trustees of the Auburn seminary allowed the charter to be transferred to the city of Elmira.

This was, in part, due to Simeon Benjamin, who offered $5,000 to the committee if they moved the college to Elmira. In May 1853, the estate of Thomas Noyes was chosen as the site of the college. Architects were asked to submit possible designs for the building; the committee approved of the use of a Greek cross design. The Regents of the University of the State of New York gave a charter to the Elmira Collegiate Seminary on October 23, 1853; the name was later changed to Elmira Female College.

First years 
The first students at Elmira College arrived in October 1855, though there had been a strike led by the contractor. Thus when the students first arrived, the rooms had not yet been completely furnished; there was very little furniture in most rooms and the furnace was not yet in working order. Also, not all of the students were ready for college-level work, and were separated according to their abilities. The administration was plagued by a lack of sufficient funds for many years and a president when classes first began.

At the State Fair held in Elmira in September 1855, Augustus W. Cowles visited the college campus. At the end of October, the college board agreed to pursue Cowles as president of the college. A series of discussions and offers were made, and on June 5, Cowles was formally offered the position of president at Elmira College. Members of the board of trustees hoped that Cowles would "place the highest value upon Christian culture" (67), as said by Professor Boyd, a former contender for the presidency of Elmira College. Cowles echoed this sentiment in his speech at his inauguration, saying of the college, "religious plans and purposes lie at its foundations" (69).

The substantial funding providing to Vassar College by its namesake, Matthew Vassar, helped the college to overshadow Elmira College as the first college for women. However, Milo Jewett, Vassar's first president, modeled the acceptance requirements and curriculum of his school upon those of Elmira College when Vassar opened in 1865.

The members of the first graduating class of Elmira College received their diplomas in 1859. With the beginning of the Civil War, the college began suffering from reduced funding. In response to this, Simeon Benjamin offered $25,000 - in return for certain changes. Desiring to entrust the care of Elmira to a larger group, Benjamin wanted a board of nineteen men "to be appointed by the Presbyterian Synod of Geneva" (85). Men from other Christian churches would be chosen as members in this new board. This was the result of Benjamin's intention to have Elmira College "...rest upon a noble, broad and Catholic basis" (85).

Instead of following the request for $50,000 from the New York legislature, a private attempt was made to collect $100,000. This attempt failed and, in 1866, was replaced by the earlier request for $50,000 from the legislature. Unfortunately, this fundraising campaign stalled at $40,000. Gilbert Meltzer, author of another book about Elmira College's early years, declared that the Synod of Geneva hindered the college's ability to collect funds (88).

When Simeon Benjamin died in September 1868, the president of the college, Cowles, assumed the task of managing the school's monetary affairs. Described by Barber as possessing "...the scholar-artist's inability to cope with money matters" (91), Cowles was unsuccessful in maintaining sufficient financial security for the college.

In short, the college faced a difficult beginning. The student body was minuscule; in 1884, only three students were in the graduating class. Two reasons given for this situation are the national tumult caused by the Civil War and the opening of other colleges that admitted women.

Elmira College began to distance itself from the Presbyterian Synod of Geneva. Both Cowles and Eaton Frisbie, president of the trustees, expressed irritation over the Synod's lack of financial assistance in June 1871. Cowles believed that the lack of funds was caused by the perception that Elmira College was only on the level of a boarding school. He stressed hiring better professors to secure larger graduating classes.

The Fassetts offered their estate, Strathmont, for use by the college. However, it was decided that the school would not abandon their original buildings.

President Cowles continued to push for increased funds throughout the 1870s. In 1888, he announced his desire to resign as president of the college. Before leaving, Cowles declared that dropping the preparatory program at the college would strengthen students' diplomas; many other colleges, including Vassar, did not have such programs.

A series of presidents

Elmira College had three presidents in the first seven years after Cowles resigned. He was often forced to become the interim president while a replacement was found. The first man selected in this series was Wilson D. Phraner, who guaranteed to donate one-fifth of any funds raised for improvements. Unfortunately, he was forced to retire six months later because of health problems.

His replacement was Charles Van Norden. One of his major alterations of the college was recommending the removal of "Female" from the college's name. Thus in 1890, the college's official name became Elmira College. Also, a new building was constructed under Van Norden's tenure, Gillett Memorial Hall. Van Norden left shortly thereafter, citing a conflict between him and the board over discipline and internal affairs.

The third president in this rapid succession was Rufus S. Green, who was elected in the second half of 1893. In January 1896, he announced his resignation.

Five months later, Alexander MacKenzie was suggested as a possibility for Elmira's next president. He told the board that he was in the process of raising $100,000 with $53,000 already raised. While he wanted to remain in Owego, he accepted the presidency.

Financial and scholastic improvement

MacKenzie was largely responsible for rescuing Elmira College from closing its doors. Raising $38,000 helped the college to pay off some of its debts, and MacKenzie continued fundraising, gaining $100,000 to pay off the $90,000 debt. MacKenzie secured $30,000 from Andrew Carnegie in 1906, declaring that he could find other donors to give an additional $30,000. With this $60,000, the college built Carnegie Hall. In order to gain this money, Elmira had to change its charter. The Carnegie Foundation required that the college be independent and nonsectarian. MacKenzie, during his time as president, increased both the number of faculty members and students. On March 23, 1915 he died of illness, ending his term as president.

MacKenzie had sought to increase the number of faculty members; these people helped to improve the school's academics. One person whom MacKenzie brought to Elmira was Martha Harris, who became dean of the school in 1901. Upon her arrival, Dean Harris formulated a student government, which gave some responsibility to the student body. She ordered the removal of sash curtains from students' rooms, though critics feared that the girls would be subjected to voyeurs. Also, she established May Day and a drama society. After the death of MacKenzie, Harris took over as Elmira's president. Another faculty member hired during MacKenzie's tenure as president was Adelbert Hamilton. In 1918, he became the college's vice president while maintaining his status as a professor.

After MacKenzie's death, John Shaw was chosen as his replacement as president. He was inaugurated in November 1916. At this inauguration, Shaw announced that the college had procured $50,000 to build Alumnae Hall. During Shaw's presidency, Jacob Fassett proposed moving the college to his estate at Strathmont. In a letter written while in Florida, Fassett described the growth limitations from which Elmira would suffer from in later years. Others involved in the college, including Dean Harris, discussed ideas that would help the college grow in size for later development. In February 1918, Shaw announced his resignation. Several personal rumors about Shaw had been discussed, and Shaw sought to protect the reputation of the college from such rumors.

Frederick Lent was chosen as Elmira's next president. During Lent's presidency, students were required to attend chapel services and take courses in which the Bible was studied. Also during this period, the college began an Extension Department that allowed adult men and women to take classes. Lent set out to raise one million dollars for use in building more facilities at the college in 1922. By June of the following year, over $700,000 had been raised. This money was used to build a new library and dormitory. In June 1935, Lent declared his decision to retire.

The college's eighth president, William Pott, was elected in May 1935. He was unique in respect to previous presidents because he was not a clergyman. In fact, he came to Elmira from a position at General Motors. Pott intended to leave after a predetermined length of time, hoping not to stay on as president for too long, as he felt many other presidents did.

In June 1938, the trustees discussed the possible renunciation of the college's ties to the Board of Christian Education of the Presbyterian Church. They felt that the limitations placed on the curriculum by the Board was "out of all proportion to the financial benefits resulting therefrom" (218).

Before the United States entry into World War II, Pott planned to raise $975,000, which would be used to build an auditorium known as Mark Twain Hall and the Seymour Lowman Memorial Pool. Because of financial constraints created due to the war, these buildings were never constructed.

In April 1947, Pott declared that his resignation would take effect in June 1948. Lewis Eldred replaced him as the ninth president of Elmira College; he took office in June 1949 and left five years later. His successor was J. Ralph Murray.

Elmira College became coeducational in 1969.

Recent history
The college has an enrollment of under 850 students, down from its all time high enrollment of just under 1,200 in 2014.

In 2016 the United States Department of Education determined the college had violated Title IX of the Education Amendments of 1972, for failure to promptly and equitably respond to complaints of sexual harassment and sexual violence.  Specifically, the Office of Civil Rights investigation determined that in fifteen of the sixteen incidents reported at the college over three years, the college's response was either in violation of Title IX or another serious concern was raised.

Athletics
Elmira College is a member of the NCAA, New York State Women's Collegiate Athletic Association (NYSWCAA), ECAC, UCHC, and Empire 8. Their mascot is the Soaring Eagle. Men's sports include baseball, basketball, cross-country, golf, ice hockey, lacrosse, soccer, tennis and volleyball; while women's sports include basketball, cross-country, cheerleading, field hockey, golf, ice hockey, lacrosse, soccer, softball, tennis and volleyball. On July 15, 2020, the Empire 8 Conference postponed all fall sports, but will provide conference championships in those sports in Spring 2021.

The college will add both men's and women's wrestling as intercollegiate programs for the 2020–21 academic year. Elmira College sponsored men's wrestling in the early 1970s but the sport was later discontinued.

Elmira College holds several NCAA Division III National Championships in Women's Ice Hockey as well as in NCA Competitive Cheerleading. Elmira College is a member of the  United Collegiate Hockey Conference (UCHC) which has postponed conference competition until January 1, 2021 due to the COVID pandemic.

International students
On April 30, 1954, Elmira College became licensed to educate international students. Such students comprise seven percent of the student population and come from about twenty different countries.

Academics

In 1867, the Elmira College Alumnae Association was created.

Anna Bronson, the first dean of Elmira College, came to the school in the 1860s. She thoroughly enforced the rules. For example, the students’ schedule was rigidly set: they woke up at 5:00 in the morning and had lights out at 9:45 at night. A chaperone was required for trips into town.

Professional men were invited to speak at the college, beginning in 1874. The college has had some notable commencement speakers in its history. William Howard Taft, former president, spoke in 1919. Four years later, Sir Auckland Geddes, a former British ambassador to the United States gave a speech at the graduation ceremony.

During Pott's presidency, Elmira College began an academic program for veterans. GIs were able to study at the college for two years before moving to another college to receive their diplomas. This program was important to the development of the college because it showed the strength of the college. As W. Charles Barker wrote, "An A student at Elmira was an A student wherever he landed" (227). Also, it, along with the program for males under Westinghouse scholarships, brought male students to the all-female college. The Westinghouse-Elmira College Scholarships were started in 1952. These scholarships allowed men, and women, to study at Elmira College in pursuit of an associate degree in applied science.

In 1940, Elmira College was granted a chapter of Phi Beta Kappa.

Elmira College's academic calendar contains a special six-week Spring Term, which is held in April and May. Courses taken during this term are usually not major-required, but can count as elective courses. They "tend to aim at the generalized aspect of student education" (Bulletin 24). However, some specialized courses are taken during this six-week period, such as lower level student teaching courses for education majors or nursing clinicals. Several courses are taught in foreign countries as part of the college's study abroad program.

Buildings

Cowles Hall - The original building of the campus, built in 1855 and designed by a man named Farrar, has an octagonal center, seventy feet in diameter, and four arms in the shape of a Greek cross. Only three of these wings were built; the eastern and western arms were completed in 1855, while the northern arm was built in 1880. Its cornerstone, containing a copy of the college's charter and various other documents, was laid on July 6, 1854 during a ceremony. In 1882, construction on the north arm of Cowles Hall was completed. As the first building of the college, Cowles Hall served as a dormitory, dining hall, and classroom. On May 10, 1917, the building was dedicated to Augustus Cowles, the college's first president, and was given the name which remains today. Cowles Hall is listed on the National Register of Historic Places.
Gillett Memorial Hall - Built in 1892, a gift of Solomon Gillett. It originally served as the college's music building, containing twenty-two teaching and practice rooms and pianos. It was proposed at a meeting in June 1891 and construction was completed the following year. In the past, the third floor held the Darius Ford Museum but currently, the building contains offices for faculty members of the college. Gillett Memorial Hall is listed on the National Register of Historic Places.

Hamilton Hall - Originally the site of the library completed in June 1927. It housed several thousand volumes previously owned by Jacob Fassett, and was the college's main library until 1969 when the Gannett-Tripp Library was built. Hamilton Hall is "cited as one of the finest examples of English Collegiate Gothic architecture in America" (Bulletin 7). Hamilton Hall is listed on the National Register of Historic Places.
Murray Athletic Center - In January 1973, construction on the Murray Athletic Center was completed. Located several miles north of campus, the center is situated on two hundred thirty-five acres. Consisting of three geodesic domes, the Murray Athletic Center is the first geodesic-domed athletic complex in the world.

Dormitories
Tompkins Hall - Built in 1928 during Lent's presidency, this dormitory was the result of a fund drive for more buildings. It was given by Sarah Wey Tompkins, the wife of Ray Tompkins, a financier in Elmira. Tompkins Hall is listed on the National Register of Historic Places.
College Cottages - Originally built as homes for faculty members in 1948, these four buildings now serve as upperclassmen apartment housing.
Alumni Hall - This freshman dormitory was built in 1959 and is near Cowles Hall. It replaced Alumnae Hall, which was razed in 1977.  It was briefly known as Main Street Dormitory in the late '70s and early '80s.  This dormitory now houses both male and female students.
Anderson Hall - This co-ed freshman dormitory, named for Douglass Anderson, an Elmira industrialist and trustee, was completed in 1960. It is next to Columbia Hall and the cottages.
Columbia Hall - Located between Anderson Hall and the Gannett-Tripp Library, it is a freshman dorm.  Columbia was completed in 1965 and was rededicated in 1992 by the Prime Minister of the Bahamas, Sir Lynden Pindling, for the 500th anniversary of the Columbus voyage.
Perry Hall - Built in 1957, a co-ed dormitory named for a former Chairman of the Elmira College Board of Trustees, Charles Perry  It is next to Tompkins Hall.
Twin Towers - These residence halls were constructed in 1967 and 1968. Located adjacent to the Clarke Health Center and across from the campus center, these eight-story dorms have suites for five students and double rooms.  
Meier Hall - Completed in 2010 at a cost of $32.8 million, Meier Hall is named for the twelfth President of Elmira College, Doctor Thomas Keith Meier. Located next to the Gannett-Tripp Library. Gothic style architecture similar to Tompkins Hall, Hamilton Hall, and the Speidel Gymnasium. Co-ed dormitory with two penthouses, single rooms with adjoining baths, two triples with a kitchen and bath, and adjoining double rooms.

Academic buildings
Harris Hall - Constructed as an academic building for $175,000 in 1950 and named for Dean Martha Harris. The dedication ceremony, held in October 1950, was attended by Harris, who was then ninety-four.
Kolker Hall - Built in 1962 as the science hall. Today, several chemistry and biology labs are inside this building.

Watson Fine Arts - Construction on this building was finished in 1958. Today it is used primarily by the music and math departments. There are  practice rooms for piano students and a small black box theatre. The student-run radio station WECW was originally located in this building on the third floor before it was moved to the Campus Center in the mid-80s.  This building was named for Mr. and Mrs. Thomas J. Watson.

Gannett-Tripp Library - The college library built in 1969. It has more than 300,000 books. The second floor of the library contains the Mark Twain Archive.
Carnegie Hall - Constructed in 1911 with funds partially given by Andrew Carnegie. Carnegie was originally designated as the science building and today houses laboratories for the school's science and nursing programs. It is three stories tall and is located south of Gillett Memorial Hall and Alumni Hall. It underwent remodeling in 1963. Carnegie Hall is listed on the National Register of Historic Places.
Fassett Commons - In 1916, Mr. and Mrs. Jacob Fassett donated $30,000 to the college for construction of a dining hall. It became the main dining hall in 1917. It is connected to the north arm of Cowles Hall. Faculty members of the art department have their offices in Fassett Commons, which is listed on the National Register of Historic Places.

Speidel Gymnasium/Emerson Hall - This building is the site of the gymnasium, originally built in 1956 and renovated forty years later. Near the gymnasium, one can find several athletic offices, two racquetball courts, the Locke Pool, and the college fitness center. Emerson is home to the theatre program and includes a rehearsal hall, dance studio and Gibson Theatre, a 250 seat proscenium theatre.  
McGraw Hall - Located on Park Place, it is the main administration building of Elmira College. It was built in 1961 and named for Harold W. McGraw, a former Chairman of Elmira College's Board of Trustees. Several administrative and professors’ offices are located in this building.
Curtis McGraw Bookstore - Initially opened in 1961 as a gift in the memory of Curtis W. McGraw, president of the McGraw-Hill Companies in the early 1950s.
President's Home - now serves as the Office of Admissions and Financial Aid.

Campus Center - Opened in 1965, this building contains the college's dining hall along with MacKenzie's, a renovated bowling alley, classrooms and Student Affairs offices.  Also, the broadcasting booth of WECW is located in this building.
Clarke Health Center - Built in 1975 and named for Harriet Pratt Clarke from the class of 1890.
Mark Twain's Study - This building is in the shape of an octagon, similar to Cowles Hall. Originally existing at Quarry Farm, it now stands adjacent to Cowles Hall. The study was donated to the college in 1952 by Ida Langdon, Mark Twain's niece. Mark Twain's Study is listed on the National Register of Historic Places.
Lowman Greenhouse - Built in 1942.

Former buildings
For eighty years, Elmira College possessed an observatory built by Professor Charles Farrar. Professor Farrar began buying telescopes for the observatory in 1859, and construction began in August 1859. The observatory first opened for use in April 1860 under the control of the Elmira Academy of Sciences. Twenty years later, control was transferred to Elmira College. Students would gather in the observatory for "dome parties" (102). "The domed building, which occupied a triangular plot fronting on Seventh Street, stood until 1939" (94).

Park Place School was housed in the observatory, and provided students with use of the college facilities. In June 1895, plans were made to construct a building specifically for the school.

There was a chapel at Elmira College, in which a memorial plaque was placed for the first dean of the college, Anna M. Bronson.

Alumnae Hall was built in 1917 as a sophomore dormitory.

The first gymnasium at the college was built in 1924. This wooden gymnasium was built as a temporary structure until a permanent one could be erected.

The school had College Apartments built a block south of Tompkins Hall in 1948.

The first incarnation of the Elmira College museum existed in Cowles Hall, but its artifacts were later moved to Gillett Memorial Hall.

MacKenzie Cottage was originally a residence built sometime around 1890. It became a dormitory in 1916.

Notable alumni and former students

Anne Kendrick Benedict -  Author of children's literature focusing on scientific topics
Gandy Brodie - Fine artist described as a "Second Generation Abstract Expressionist"
 Olivia Langdon Clemens - wife of Samuel Clemens (Mark Twain) and the daughter of Jervis Langdon, one of the college's founding trustees
 Chip Coffey - A psychic and parapsychologist who has speaking tours with Patti Starr, Coffey was awarded a Pigasus Award "For the psychic who tricked the most people with the least effort".
 Lena Gilbert Ford - Lyricist of the song "Keep The Home Fires Burning"
 Wilhelmina Holladay - Co-founder of National Museum of Women in the Arts, Washington, D.C.
 Fay Kanin - Screenwriter/play author/producer and former president of the Academy of Motion Picture Arts and Sciences from 1979-1983
 Harry Palmer - Developer of the Avatar Course, a personal development system translated into 19 languages and taught in over 60 countries. Founder of Star's Edge, Inc.
 Mary Gray Peck (BA, 1889) - journalist, suffragist, and clubwoman
 Alice Mary Robertson - First Congresswoman from Oklahoma who supported the rights of Native Americans and opposed certain women's groups
 Jane Meade Welch - journalist, lecturer
 Sheila Williams - Editor of Asimov's Science Fiction magazine

See also
 Elmira College Old Campus
 New-York Central College – short-lived pioneer in higher education for women

References

Bibliography
 Barber, William Charles (1955). Elmira College: The First 100 Years. New York: McGraw Hill. LCCN 55–009100.

External links
Official website

 
1855 establishments in New York (state)
Education in Chemung County, New York
Educational institutions established in 1855
Former women's universities and colleges in the United States
Chemung
Elmira, New York
Private universities and colleges in New York (state)